Clarice di Durisio da Foggia (fl. 15th century), was an Italian eye physician and surgeon from Foggia.

She was educated at the University of Salerno and belonged to the minority of female students of her time period. She specialized in the diseases of the eye and was licensed to treat only female patients.

References

See also 

Year of birth missing
Year of death missing
15th-century Italian physicians
Medieval women physicians
Schola Medica Salernitana
15th-century Italian women
Medieval surgeons